Chief Candido Joao Da Rocha ( 1860 – March 11, 1959) was a Nigerian businessman, landowner and creditor who owned Water House on Kakawa Street, Lagos Island, Lagos, and was the proprietor of the now defunct Bonanza Hotel in Lagos. He held the chieftaincy title of the Lodifi of Ilesa.

History
Da Rocha, a native of Ilesha, was born to the family of Joao Esan Da Rocha, a former Brazilian slave; his father was 10 years old when he was captured as a slave in about 1840 and Candido was born in the Bahia region of Brazil. 

Candido attended CMS Grammar School, Lagos where he was peers with Isaac Oluwole and Herbert Macaulay. 

Candido is the brother of Moses Da Rocha, one of the earliest Western-trained Nigerian doctors. He lived in Water House on Kakawa Street, Lagos, a house built by his father. The home was commemorated in literature by a novel, The Water House, written by Antonio Olinto. The house had a borehole and the first water fountain in Lagos Island; water was sold from his house to consumers. Some of his business interests included a restaurant called The Restaurant Da Rocha and Sierra Leone Deep Sea Fishing Industries Ltd. He collaborated with Lagos businessmen J. H. Doherty and Sedu Williams on a money lending business established under the name of the Lagos Native Bank. He was a founding member of the Lagos auxiliary to the Anti Slavery and Aborigines Right Society which was headed by James Johnson and had Samuel Pearse, Hon. Justice Dahunsi Olugbemi Coker and Sapara Williams as members.

Da Rocha died in 1959 and is buried at Ikoyi Cemetery. Among his children were Alexander Da Rocha, Adenike Afodu, Angelica Folashade Thomas and Louissa Turton.

References

19th-century Nigerian businesspeople
Nigerian restaurateurs
1860 births
1959 deaths
History of Lagos
Nigerian landowners
People from Bahia
Brazilian emigrants to Nigeria
Nigerian abolitionists
20th-century Nigerian businesspeople
Lagos Island
Brazilian people of Yoruba descent
Yoruba businesspeople
Burials at Ikoyi Cemetery
Nigerian hoteliers
People from colonial Nigeria
CMS Grammar School, Lagos alumni
Businesspeople from Lagos